Union Academy may refer to:

 Union Academy (Bartow, Florida)
 Union Academy (Gainesville, Florida)
 Union Academy (Macon County, North Carolina)
 Union Academy (Monroe, North Carolina)
 Union Academy Senior Secondary School, New Delhi